The 2012 Arkansas State Red Wolves football team represents Arkansas State University in the 2012 NCAA Division I FBS football season. They were led by first year head coach Gus Malzahn and played their home games at Liberty Bank Stadium as  members of the Sun Belt Conference. Arkansas State recorded a Sun Belt conference championship on the way to a 10–3 season.  Malzahn vacated the position prior to the team's bowl game to assume the head coach position at Auburn University. Defensive coordinator John Thompson led the team as interim head coach to victory over the Kent State Golden Flashes in the 2013 GoDaddy.com Bowl.

Schedule

Game summaries

@ Oregon

1st quarter scoring: ORE - Kenjon Barner 4-yard run (Dion Jordan pass from Jackson Rice); ORE - D. Thomas 12-yard pass from Marcus Mariota (Rob Beard kick); ORE - Josh Huff 4-yard pass from Mariota (Beard kick); ORE - Barner 17-yard run (Beard kick)

2nd quarter scoring: A-STATE - Brian Davis 43-yard field goal; ORE - Thomas 12-yard pass from Mariota (Beard kick); ORE - Thomas 33-yard run (Beard kick); ORE - Byron Marshall 3-yard run (Beard kick); A-STATE - Julian Jones 72-yard pass from Ryan Aplin (Davis, Brian kick)

3rd quarter scoring: A-STATE - Davis 29-yard field goal; A-STATE - Josh Jarboe 6-yard pass from Aplin (Davis kick)

4th quarter scoring: ORE - Rahsaan Vaughn 7-yard pass from Bryan Bennett (Beard kick); A-STATE - Carlos McCants 38-yard pass from Aplin (Davis kick); A-STATE - Aplin 1-yard run (Davis kick)

Memphis

@ Nebraska

Alcorn State

WKU

@ FIU

South Alabama

@ Louisiana–Lafayette

@ North Texas

Louisiana–Monroe

@ Troy

Middle Tennessee

Kent State–GoDaddy.com Bowl

References

Arkansas State
Arkansas State Red Wolves football seasons
Sun Belt Conference football champion seasons
LendingTree Bowl champion seasons
Arkansas State Red Wolves football